The Quanzhou–Nanning Expressway, designated as G72 and  commonly referred to as the Quannan Expressway is an expressway that connects the cities of Quanzhou, Fujian, China, and Nanning, Guangxi. 

The entire expressway was completed on 16 January 2015.

The portion of the G72 which connects Guilin and Liuzhou is referred to as the  Guiliu Expressway.

References

Chinese national-level expressways
Expressways in Fujian
Expressways in Jiangxi
Expressways in Hunan
Expressways in Guangxi